Ebelsbach is a municipality in the district of Haßberge in Bavaria in Germany.

References

Haßberge (district)